Odyssey Magazine is a South African holistic lifestyle and wellness magazine launched 7 July 1977.

Our Vision is to publish content to nourish, uplift and inspire, exploring all aspects of holistic and conscious living, the joy of living authentically, integrative approaches of complementary healing, spirituality, metaphysics, the intuitive arts and our integral connection with nature, planetary wellbeing and the mysteries beyond. And to create a phenomenal advertising platform for our advertisers.

Passion

Doing what we love in the place we choose to be.

Authenticity 
Delivering from the heart; to be the magazine we would want to read.

Collaboration 
Collaborating to produce exceptional content; content is key.

Community 
Connecting with all of you is the best thing about our business.

Founded on 7.7.1977 we are the foremost, long-standing holistic and conscious living magazine in South Africa. Odyssey Magazine has been dedicated to holistic and conscious living for over four decades.

Our commitment is to publish four print editions annually to coincide with the seasons. Print editions are also available as a digital flipbook and as mobile and smartphone-enabled online magazine. – www.odysseymagazine.co.za

We are dedicated to publishing open-minded and enlightening content to nourish and inspire without fear or favour.

Our History

Odyssey Magazine is in its 45th year. Once a journal for like-minded souls, it has matured into the primary and only quarterly holistic and conscious lifestyle print magazine in Southern Africa with both digital and mobile enabled version for both local and international readers. Contributors and advertisers.

Jill Iggulden Stevens, who established Odyssey Magazine in 1977, handed over the baton to daughter-in-law Debra (Stevens) Robins, Editor, on 23.11.2018 in Cape Town, following the purchase of Odyssey Magazine from Chris and Silke Erasmus who had nurtured this beautiful publication for 18 years.

The inspiration for Odyssey Magazine came to Jill in February 1977 while she was putting together the Maryland Reader, a 16-page booklet for learners who had just learnt to read through the Lubach ‘Each-One-Teach-One’ literacy training programme. Jill had so enjoyed this project, in which she was able to inspire other teachers to write articles to motivate the newly literate readers, that Jill pondered the prospects of bringing out a magazine. On July 7 that year, her dream of having a conscious living magazine was realised:“I thought how wonderful it would be… a magazine with articles on religious philosophy, a new approach to education, alternative technology, parapsychology, holistic healing and the inter-relationship between thought and manifestation,” remembered Jill. She went on to say: “It seems like yesterday that Gerald Moskovitz and I emerged from the premises of Associated Press carrying our first few copies of Odyssey Magazine, literally hot off the press. The bulk of the 5 000 print copies ordered would be delivered to CNA’s warehouse manager at Buitengacht Street and the rest would be distributed by Mossie, on foot, to his established distribution network.”Seven years later, a healthy and well-established publication was handed over to a new team – Rose de la Hunt and Jean Mitchell; Rose with a 10-year tenure as a counselling director at Lifeline, decided to take the leap of faith.

Rose's 17 years as editor of Odyssey coincided with a period of enormous growth and change in the world of spiritual ideas and experience. Rose described it as “truly a time of the ‘rebirth’ of the sacred” and during her tenure Odyssey was the only magazine of its kind in South Africa. In 2001 the magazine was taken over by Chris and Silke Erasmus following a deterioration in Rose's health.

Before her passing to spirit, Rose wrote:“For me those 17 years were incredibly rich and fulfilling, though I worked extremely long hours, the deadlines were relentless and things were not always easy. I really loved my work. And I felt blessed by the opportunities it brought me to meet many great and beautiful souls, visiting luminaries and ‘forerunners’ of a new kind of spirituality.”In 2004, Namaste Magazine merged with Odyssey Magazine and they teamed up to become one. Namaste's aim was to empower individuals to take full responsibility for their own lives – on every level – physical, emotional, mental and spiritual – a vision that is still infused in Odyssey magazine today. Following the incorporation of Namaste into Odyssey Magazine and the opening of a Johannesburg office, Odyssey grew rapidly between 2005 and 2007. In 2007, rather than publish monthly, a collective decision was made to retain Odyssey as a bi-monthly publication. In late 2008, Simply Green was launched and Odyssey reached its all-time circulation high of over 18 000, with a print readership roughly 10 times that number.

Silke Erasmus shared her experiences with us, stating:“the global downturn of 2008-09 hit Odyssey magazine and its sibling as severely as any other print publication, but both ultimately rode out the storm. Emerging stronger. With fewer competitors and Simply Green having won an eco-journalism award in 2010, Odyssey and its sister magazine were actively at the forefront of making the move to digital media consumption. In early 2013, both launched full time into digital. Whilst difficult and challenging, as well as requiring a whole range of new skills, the move proved to be almost immediately and dramatically successful in terms of producing highly readable and free digital publications. Issue 5 of December 2013 achieved a remarkable reach of over 366 000 reads and impressions within 30 days of going live and ultimately achieved in excess of 450 000.”Odyssey has maintained its place steadfastly with many long-time loyal readers. As it moves into its fourth set of caring hands, the publication, now one of South Africa's longest-standing magazines, continues its legacy of consciousness-raising content aimed at the self-empowerment of all.

References

External links
Odyssey Magazine

1977 establishments in South Africa
2013 disestablishments in South Africa
Defunct magazines published in South Africa
Lifestyle magazines
Magazines established in 1977
Magazines disestablished in 2013
Online magazines with defunct print editions
Magazines published in South Africa